Jaroslav Ježek (26 January 1923 – 2002) was a Czech industrial designer. He was one of the founders of the Brussels style, an important development in Czech design in 1950s and 60s. Ježek created 52 complete porcelain sets and more than one hundred designs for porcelain sculptures.

Biography 
Jaroslav Ježek, nephew of the Czech composer Jaroslav Ježek, was born in 1923 in Podlesí near Příbram. Between 1945 and 1949 he studied Art Education under Professor Sejpka, Cyril Bouda and Karel Lidický at Charles University in Prague but on the recommendation of Professor Eckert, of the Atelier of Porcelain and Ceramics (a department of the Prague Academy of Performing Arts) he decided to concentrate instead on industrial production. Ježek left Charles University for a scholarship place in the art department of the Thun porcelain manufactory in Klášterec nad Ohří, and remained there until 1954. In 1955 he was recruited by the new state-run industrial porcelain development center at Lesov, near Karlovy Vary.

In 1957 Ježek was invited to create designs for the Expo '58 in Brussels. His porcelain set Elka was exhibited there, and was awarded the Expo Grand Prix for Ceramics. Ježek also designed the porcelain set  Asmanit for the Brussels' Expo restaurant. He was one of the leading exponents for the "Brussels style", which was characterised by the use of organic shapes, diagonal elements and surfaces marked by pastel shadows of yellow, purple, green, azure and gray. It later became a signature design style in many Czech households. Other exponents of the "Brussels style" applied it to synthetic materials such as plastics, laminates and Formica.

The success of Elka inspired Ježek to create similar extravagant sets of porcelain tableware. In 1959 his Ex, Manon and Tria designs were approved for production as luxury giftware, and his simpler Orava and Ciráno porcelain sets for everyday use. Other sets - Blanka and Hanka - were produced in 1960 and 1961, in Dalovice and Loket. In the 1960s, Ježek drew upon historical styles of the Baroque and the early 19th century, but also developed his own extravagant designs, with sets like Kleopatra and Giovanna (influenced by Elka), and original designs such as Ryby (Fishes). His works were influenced also by modern painting, and in addition to his designer tasks he was also an active painter. Ježek remained in the Lesov development center up to his retirement.

He died in 2002, in Karlovy Vary.

Selected works

Porcelain sculptures
 1958 - Hřebečkové (Stallions), Klisnička (Mare), Volavky (Herons)
 1959 - Páv (Peacock), Jitro (Morning)
 1963 - Velký býk (Big Bull)

Porcelain sets
 1956 - Oblázek (Peeble) - (unrealized)
 1957 - Elka 
 1958 - Asmanit (ovenware porcelain)
 1959 - Ex, Tria, Manon, Orava
 1963 - Rafaela
 1966 - Romana
 1964 - Nefertiti

Awards
 1958 - Grand Prix at the Expo '58 in Brussels (porcelain sculptures Mare and Stallions)
 1958 - Grand Prix at the Expo '58 in Brussels (porcelain set Elka) 
 1962 - Gold medal at the International Exhibition of Ceramic AIC in Prague (collection of figural sculptures) 
 1962 - Gold medal at the International Exhibition of Ceramic AIC in Prague (collection of utilitarian porcelain)
 1963 - State Award for excellent work 
 1967 - Silver medal at the International Exhibition of Ceramic AIC in Istanbul (porcelain set Romana)

References

Further reading

External links
Brusel Expo 1958, Brussels style, works of Jaroslav Ježek

1923 births
2002 deaths
Czech ceramists
Czech industrial designers
People from Příbram District
Product designers
20th-century ceramists